Simon Mercep is a New Zealand television and radio journalist. 

Mercep is the son of noted architect Ivan Mercep, and is of mixed Croatian and Polish descent. Starting his career as a trainee journalist with Radio New Zealand, his early career included work in Australia Canada and the United Kingdom, as well as working as a print journalist in Cyprus.

Mercep has gone on to work in both television and radio in New Zealand, acting as reporter on TVNZ's One News, Holmes, Sunday (since 2008), and Fair Go (2001–07), as well as Radio New Zealand's Morning Report (2010–14), and more recently Afternoons (2014–15). He left Radio New Zealand in mid 2015, but continues in his roles with Television New Zealand. Since 2015 Mercep has produced and co-hosted Crave!, a film and music review podcast and website, with Steve McCabe.

Since 2021 Mercep has worked as a casual on-air reporter and story producer for TVNZ.

See also
 List of New Zealand television personalities

References

External links
 Crave! home page

Living people
New Zealand television presenters
New Zealand radio presenters
New Zealand radio journalists
New Zealand television journalists
New Zealand people of Croatian descent
New Zealand people of Polish descent
Year of birth missing (living people)